Sisak is a city in central Croatia.

Sisak may also refer to:

 Şuşca, a Romanian village called Sisak in Hungarian, in the Pojejena commune
 Sisak (eponym), a legendary figure in Armenian history
 Sisak (film), a 2017 short film

See also
 Shishak